Wargame: European Escalation is a real-time tactics video game developed by Eugen Systems and published by Focus Home Interactive, released on February 23, 2012. It is set in Europe during the Cold War, most specifically in the years 1975–85 with alternate history scenarios portraying open war between NATO and the Warsaw Pact.

Gameplay
Wargames playable factions are the Warsaw Pact, which is subdivided into the Soviet Union, Communist Poland, East Germany, and Czechoslovakia; and NATO, which is subdivided into the United States of America, United Kingdom, France, and West Germany. Players can choose various units from the four subfactions of the side they are playing on, unlocking new units or improved variants as they progress. In all, there are 361 historical units recreated in Wargame.

Each country has its own arsenal of units, reflecting their military doctrine.

Solo Mode
Solo mode is divided into four individual campaigns called "Operations", two for each faction. Each are unrelated and chronicle scenarios based on actual events that came close to triggering open war between the two NATO and Warsaw Pact forces.

Reception

Wargame: European Escalation, has received generally positive reviews upon release, with a Metacritic score of 81/100.

Sequels
On August 10, 2012, a sequel, Wargame: AirLand Battle, was announced with a release scheduled in the spring of 2013. Like its predecessor, it is set in the Cold War period of 1975–85 but focus the NATO–Warsaw Pact war in Northern Europe, notably in Scandinavia, along with the addition of the player's own air force.

Wargame: Red Dragon was announced in 2013 and released in April 2014. Set in the Asian theater of war, it includes units from the 1990s and introduces naval forces.

See also

 List of PC exclusive titles
 Wargame: AirLand Battle
 Wargame: Red Dragon
 Victory! The Battle for Europe

References

External links
 

Alternate history video games
Cold War video games
Real-time strategy video games
Video games developed in France
Windows games
2012 video games
Focus Entertainment games
MacOS games
Linux games
Video games set in Germany
World War III video games